Streptomyces xantholiticus is a bacterium species from the genus of Streptomyces. Streptomyces xantholiticus produces xanthalycin A, xanthalycin B and pentaene.

See also 
 List of Streptomyces species

References

Further reading

External links
Type strain of Streptomyces xantholiticus at BacDive – the Bacterial Diversity Metadatabase

xantholiticus
Bacteria described in 1970